Caspersnek Pass is an untarred Drakensberg pass that straddles the border between the Limpopo and Mpumalanga provinces of South Africa, to connect the Ohrigstad and Blyde valleys.

It is to the north of the Robbers and Long Tom Pass, and passes between the Mapasebone and Lehwiting heights of the Drakensberg.

See also
 Mpumalanga Passes

Mountain passes of Mpumalanga